Hadi or Hady  is an Arabic masculine given name and surname. Al-Hadi is one of the 99 names of God in Islam meaning guide (from the Arabic triconsonantal root ; also present in hidayah).

Given name

Hadi
 Hadi Saei (born 1976), Iranian taekwondo athlete
 Hadi Soua'an Al-Somaily (born 1976), Saudi Arabian athlete
 Hadi Elazzi (born 1973), Turkish music producer and manager
 Hadi Aghily (born 1980), Iranian footballer
 Hadi Kazemi (born 1976), Iranian actor, narrator, sculptor, painter and photographer
 Hadi Khorsandi (born 1943), Iranian poet, satirist and editor
 Hadi Norouzi (1985–2015), Iranian footballer
 Hadi Shakouri (born 1982), Iranian footballer
 Hadi Teherani (born 1954), Iranian-German architect and designer living in Germany
 Hadi al-Mahdi (c. 1967 – 2011), Iraqi journalist, radio talk show host, and assassination victim
 Hadi Thayeb (1922–2014), Indonesian diplomat and politician
 Hadi Ghaffari (born 1950), Iranian Hujjat al-Islam
 Hadi Khamenei (born 1947), Iranian reformist politician, mojtahed and linguist
 Hadi al-Modarresi (born 1957), Iranian Ayatollah
 Mohammad Hadi Ghazanfari Khansari (born 1957), Iraqi-born Iranian Ayatollah
 Mohammad Hadi Milani (18921975), Iranian Ayatollah
 Hadi Al-Amiri (born 1954), Iraqi general and politician 
 Hadi al-Bahra (born 1959), Syrian politician
 Hadi Al Masri (born 1986), Syrian footballer

Hady
 Hady Amr, U.S. political advisor and Special Envoy
 Hady Habib (born 1998), Lebanese tennis player
 Hady Khashaba (born 1972), Egyptian footballer
 Hady Mirza (born 1980), Singaporean singer
 Hady Pfeiffer (1906-2002), Austrian and German alpine skier
 Hady Shahin (born 1986), Egyptian handball player

Surname
 Abd Rabbuh Mansur Hadi (born 1945), Yemeni President
 Noor Hadi (born 1986), Indonesian footballer
 Saiyid Muhammad Hadi (1863-1939), Indian agricultural technologist
 Seftia Hadi (born 1991), Indonesian footballer

Derived name
 Abdul Hadi, Arabic theophoric name
 Mahdi, Arabic theophoric name
 Huda (given name), Arabic gender-neutral theophoric name

See also

 Arabic name

Arabic masculine given names
Arabic-language surnames
Names of God in Islam